Badepalli is a village in the southern state of Karnataka, India. Administratively, Badepalli is under Ajlapur gram panchayat, Yadgir Taluka of Yadgir District in Karnataka. Badepalli is 10 km by road south of the village of Madhawar, and 14 km by road east of the town of Saidapur, where Narayanpet Road Station is the nearest railway station.

Demographics
As of 2001 India census, Badepalli had a population of 3,027 with 1,497 males and 1,530 females.

See also
 Yadgir

References

External links 
 

Villages in Yadgir district